United Christian Hospital is  Christianity founded district general hospital in Kwun Tong of New Kowloon in Hong Kong, operated by the Hospital Authority. The hospital has 1,174 beds and staff of 3,000, serving eastern Kowloon.

Founded in 1973, it has links to Alice Ho Miu Ling Nethersole Hospital via the Hong Kong Christian Council. The hospital's first chief medical superintendent was Dr. Edward Hamilton Paterson.

History
United Chrisian Hospital has its foundation stone laid on 2 April 1971 by the Governor of Hong Kong, David Trench, and was officially opened on 6 December 1973 by Murray MacLehose, Trench's successor as Governor of Hong Kong.

The hospital was expanded in the 1990s. At that time, Blocks J, K, L and S were built and Block P was redeveloped. The project was completed in 1999.

Services

 24 hours Emergency department
 Medicine & Geriatrics
 General Surgery
 Obstetrics and Gynaecology
 Paediatrics
 Orthopaedic and Traumatic Surgery
 Psychiatry
 Intensive Care
 Anaesthesia
 Diagnostic Radiology
 Pathology
 Ear-Nose-Throat
 Ophthalmology
 Neurosurgery
 Dentistry & Maxillofacial Surgery

The hospital provides in-patient, day-patient and out-patient care; it also manages the psychiatry, physiotherapy, occupational therapy and geriatric day hospital services of Yung Fung Shee Memorial Centre as well as the Eye Clinic, pharmacy and radiology services of the Pamela Youde Polyclinic at Cha Kwo Ling Road.

The hospital provides Community Nursing Services (CNS) to the patients in Kwun Tong.

Redevelopment and expansion 
The hospital is currently undergoing a major expansion and redevelopment project. This involves the demolition of Blocks F, G, and H, as well as the low block of Block P. A major new ambulatory block (Block A) will be built, a new Oncology Centre will be provided, and various other expansions and renovations will be completed. The project is set to be completed in 2023.

By the end January 2018, Secretary for Food and Health Professor Sophia Chan Siu-chee expressed her concern over the chronicle shortage of nurse across hospitals in Hong Kong. Among hospitals being affected, United Christian Hospital was cited as the worse-hit public medical service provider. Statistics showed its bed occupancy rate reached the hike of 120%, the rate of usage that was well above its maximum capacity. But, as a whole if we took a wider perspective to see the problem across other hospitals in Hong Kong, the situation of recruitment medical staff was not well either. Shortage of labour has long been an issue the public Hospital find it hard to tackle. They fell short of recruiting enough number of medical personnel. Over the past year of the 2000 vacancies available only 80 percent of which was filled, amounting to 1800 new nurses being hired by the public hospital. Added to the problem was the incoming flu season during the winter, which would for certain mount more pressure on medical stuff across hospitals in Hong Kong due to the foreseeable rise of workloads.

See also
 List of hospitals in Hong Kong

References

External links

Hospital buildings completed in 1973
Hospitals in Hong Kong
Medical Services by Protestant Churches in Hong Kong
Kwun Tong
Hospitals established in 1973